The George Cross (GC) is the second highest award of the United Kingdom honours system. It is awarded for gallantry not "in the presence of the enemy" to both members of the British armed forces and to British civilians. Posthumous awards have always been available. It was previously awarded to Commonwealth countries, most of which have established their own honours systems and no longer recommend British honours. It may be awarded to a person of any military rank in any service and to civilians including police, emergency services and merchant seamen. Many of the awards have been personally presented by the British monarch to recipients and in the case of posthumous awards to next of kin. These investitures are usually held at Buckingham Palace.

Initially, the Empire Gallantry Medal recognised acts of the highest bravery but was never considered equal in status to the Victoria Cross. The George Cross succeeded the Empire Gallantry Medal and all those living who had been awarded the medal, and all posthumous awards from the outbreak of World War II, were obliged to exchange their medal for the George Cross. In 1971, the living recipients of either the Albert Medal for Lifesaving or Edward Medal, that respectively recognised the saving of life and acts of bravery following industrial accidents, were invited to exchange their medals for the George Cross; 24 recipients elected not to exchange their medals.

Since the Second World War most Commonwealth realms have instituted their own honours systems with the second highest award being for gallantry not in the face of the enemy. In 1972, Canada created the Cross of Valour for Canadian citizens; in 1975 Australia, inspired by Canada, created a similar award with the same name in the Australian Honours System, the Cross of Valour. Recipients of the Canadian and Australian awards both use the postnominal CV. Unlike the GC within British honours, the majority of Canadian CV awards and all Australian CV awards have been to civilians. The Australian Government ceased recommendations for British awards in 1983 and the last two Australian state governments ceased recommendations in 1989. During the period when Australian states made recommendations for British awards, the Governor of Victoria recommended a GC which was granted. The award gazetted in 1978 was for 39 years the most recent award to a living civilian, until the award in 2017 to Dominic Troulan. On 5 October 1992, the Australian Prime Minister announced that Australian governments would make no further recommendations for British honours with British awards to Australians after that date being treated as foreign awards. The Queen on the recommendation of the Governor-General of New Zealand awarded the New Zealand Cross, instituted in 1999 to four individuals. There were two awards in 1999 and another two awards in 2021. The postnominal is NZC.

There have been 407 George Cross awards, including two special awards, but no honorary awards. Some recipients serving in British forces were foreign born, including Albert Guérisse (Belgium), Violette Szabo (France), and Noor Inayat Khan (Russia). All three served within the Special Operations Executive during World War II. As of October 2022 there are 13 living recipients.

Individual awards
This list contains all George Cross recipients including former recipients of the Empire Gallantry Medal, the Albert Medal or the Edward Medal who exchanged their earlier award for the George Cross.

The table defaults to sorting alphabetically by name. When sorting by the heading "Rank (or Role)", military ranks take precedence, followed by police ranks and then all civilian roles. Military ranks are sorted by the comparative rank of the recipient within the British Armed Forces, where the Royal Navy takes precedence, followed by the British Army and then Royal Air Force.

It is customary for Indian and Nepalese names to be written with the family name first, which is followed below unless their citation dictates otherwise.

List of 407 individual George Cross recipients with note whether original or exchange award. The three collective are not listed.

Group awards
By express instruction of King George VI, the Island of Malta has been awarded the George Cross collectively in perpetuity. In a letter to Malta's Governor (Lieutenant-General Sir William Dobbie) dated 15 April 1942, King George VI awarded the George Cross "to the Island Fortress of Malta to bear witness to a heroism and devotion that will long be famous in history". Dobbie replied: "By God's help Malta will not weaken but will endure until victory is won."

In a similar manner, Queen Elizabeth II awarded the Royal Ulster Constabulary the George Cross on 23 November 1999. Buckingham Palace announced that it was awarded "to honour the courage and dedication of the officers of the Royal Ulster Constabulary and their families who have shared their hardship". Queen Elizabeth II presented it in person at Hillsborough Castle, County Down. On 4 November 2001, the Royal Ulster Constabulary was reorganised and renamed as the Police Service of Northern Ireland with most former RUC officers remaining  in the new organisation .

On 5 July 2021, on the 73rd anniversary of the NHS, and during the global COVID-19 pandemic, the Queen awarded the George Cross to the National Health Service staff of the United Kingdom. The Queen wrote in a personal message: "It is with great pleasure, on behalf of a grateful nation, that I award the George Cross to the National Health Services of the United Kingdom. This award recognises all NHS staff, past and present, across all disciplines and all four nations. Over more than seven decades, and especially in recent times, you have supported the people of our country with courage, compassion and dedication, demonstrating the highest standards of public service. You have our enduring thanks and heartfelt appreciation. Elizabeth R."

See also
 List of Australian George Cross recipients
 Lists of Victoria Cross recipients
 British and Commonwealth orders and decorations

References

Specific

General

External links

 Canadian World War II recipients 
 New Zealand recipients